Palais Erdődy, also called the Palais Esterházy, was a palace in Vienna, Austria.  It was commissioned by Prince Nikolaus Esterházy II in 1802 to be designed and built by Karl von Moreau. 

The palace was three stories high and built in the Empire style. The entrance was an enormous archway with a coffered ceiling. From there, a staircase decorated with Corinthian columns led to an elegant ballroom with mirrored double-doors, walls clad in white, artificial marble, gilded capitals, frescoes, and a richly decorated parquet. It was considered one of the best examples of 19th-century architecture.

The palace was subsequently sold by the Esterházy family to the Erdődy family, under whom the palace was renamed. It was slightly damaged during World War II. The new owners, the Verein der Freunde des Wohnungseigentums (Association of the Friends of Real Estate), had the building demolished in 1955 to make way for a new building.

References 

Buildings and structures in Innere Stadt
Erdody
Esterházy family
Erdődy family
Buildings and structures demolished in 1955
Demolished buildings and structures in Austria